"Cherokee" (also known as "Cherokee (Indian Love Song)") is a jazz standard written by the British composer and band leader Ray Noble and published in 1938. It is the first of five movements in Noble's "Indian Suite" (Cherokee, Comanche War Dance, Iroquois, Seminole, and Sioux Sue).

Structure
The composition has a 64-bar AABA construction. The A-section harmony is straightforward by the standards of 1930s songs, but the B-section is more sophisticated. This is because "it cadences (via ii-7–V7–I progressions) into the keys of B Major, A Major and G Major before moving toward the B tonic."

Recordings
"Cherokee" has been recorded over the years by many jazz musicians and singers. Charlie Barnet and His Orchestra's 1939 version reached No. 15 on the pop charts; he later re-recorded it in Hi Fi stereo for Everest Records in 1958. It was later recorded by Charlie Parker, the Count Basie Orchestra, Duke Ellington, Sarah Vaughan (1955), Dakota Staton (1958), Art Tatum and Keely Smith. The song has also been covered as an instrumental by Biréli Lagrène, Bud Powell (1950), Clifford Brown, Don Byas, Stan Getz, Lionel Hampton, Harry James, Christian McBride, Chet Atkins, Kamasi Washington on his album The Epic (2015), and by Johnny Smith on his album Moonlight in Vermont.

The difficulty of improvising on the harmony of the B-section meant that many early soloists avoided improvising during it.

Influence
Charlie Parker used this song for the basis of his 1945 composition "Ko-Ko". While playing "Cherokee", he said that "I found that by using the higher intervals of a chord as a melody line and backing them with appropriately related changes, I could play the thing I'd been hearing." He had played that piece so many times that by the end he hated it, but he had mastered the chords perfectly in all 12 keys. "Ko-Ko" has a partially improvised head and the chords are based on "Cherokee".

It also formed the basis of Buddy DeFranco "Swinging the Indian".

A vocalese version (different tune, but based on the same chord sequence), with its own lyrics, was written by  Richie Cole and  David Lahm in 1983 and is called "Harold's House of Jazz".

Appearances in films
The song was used in Jam Session (1944), Jasper in a Jam (1946), sung by Peggy Lee, The Gene Krupa Story (1959), and as background music in Racing with the Moon (1984) and Lush Life (1993), a TV movie starring Jeff Goldblum and Kathy Baker. It was the tune the prisoners played in an attempt to bring down an avalanche in the next-to-last episode of Hogan's Heroes.

See also
List of 1930s jazz standards

References 

1930s jazz standards
1938 songs
Jazz compositions in B-flat major
Jazz songs
Grammy Hall of Fame Award recipients
Songs written by Ray Noble